Celebes papeda, is a citrus that grows in the northeastern Celebes and the southern Philippines. Under some taxonomic systems it is named Citrus celebica, else is a regional variant of Citrus hystrix. It is a small tree with inedible fruit.

References 

Celebica
Trees of the Philippines
Trees of Sulawesi